is a sub-kilometer asteroid on an outstandingly eccentric orbit, classified as near-Earth object and potentially hazardous asteroid of the Apollo group. The object is known for having the second-smallest perihelion of any known asteroid, after .

It was discovered on 18 October 2004 by the Lincoln Near-Earth Asteroid Research (LINEAR) at Lincoln Lab's ETS near Socorro, New Mexico.

Orbit and classification 

This Apollo asteroid orbits the Sun at a distance of 0.09–2.44 AU once every 17 months (521 days; semi-major axis of 1.27 AU). Its orbit has an outstandingly high eccentricity of 0.93 and an inclination of 24° with respect to the ecliptic.

Due to its orbit, it is also a Mercury-crosser, Venus-crosser and Mars-crosser.

Physical characteristics 

 is an assumed stony S-type asteroid.

In October 2014, a rotational lightcurve for this asteroid was obtained from photometric observations by American astronomer Brian Warner at the CS3–Palmer Divide Station in Landers, California. It gave a longer-than average rotation period of  hours (most minor planets take 2–20 hours to complete a full rotation) with a high brightness variation of 1.2 magnitude, indicating a non-spheroidal shape.

Based on a generic magnitude-to-diameter conversion,  measures between 0.5 and 1.2 kilometers. The Collaborative Asteroid Lightcurve Link assumes a standard albedo for stony asteroids of 0.20 and calculates a diameter of 0.516 kilometers with an absolute magnitude of 18.8.

Numbering and naming 

This minor planet was numbered by the Minor Planet Center on 18 October 2013. As of 2018, it has not been named.

Notes

References

External links 
 Asteroid Lightcurve Database (LCDB), query form (info )
 Asteroids and comets rotation curves, CdR Observatoire de Genève, Raoul Behrend
 
 
 

374158
374158
374158
374158
374158
20041018